The Animal Metaphor Test is a projective psychological test created by Albert J. Levis, the director and founder of the Museum of the Creative Process, in 1988. The Animal Metaphor Test is one of many tests that are part of Levis' Conflict Analysis Battery, a collection of psychological tests.

The Animal Metaphor test consists of a series of creative and analytical prompts. Unlike conventional projective tests, the Animal Metaphor works as both a diagnostic and therapeutic battery. Unlike the Rorschach test and TAT, the Animal Metaphor is premised on self-analysis via self-report questions. The test combines facets of art therapy, cognitive behavioral therapy, and insight therapy, while also providing a theoretical platform of behavioral analysis.

The test has been used widely as a clinical tool, as an educational assessment, and in human resource selection. The test was developed at the Center for the Study of Normative Behavior in Hamden, Connecticut, a clinical training and research center.

References

Further reading 
 Angus, L. E., & McLeod, J. (2004). The handbook of narrative and psychotherapy: practice, theory, and research. Thousand Oaks, Calif.: Sage Publications.

 Bruner, J. (1998). Narrative and meta-narrative. In Ferrari, M. D., & Sternberg, R. J., Self-awareness: its nature and development. New York: Guilford Press.

 Bruner, J. (2004). Life as Narrative. Social Research: An International Quarterly, 71(3), 691-710.

 Crossley, C. (2005). Consumable metaphors: Attitudes towards animals and vegetarianism in nineteenth-century France. Oxford: P. Lang.

 Levis, A. (1987). Conflict Analysis: The Formal Theory of Behavior. Manchester, Vermont: Normative Publications.

 Levis, A. (1987). Conflict Analysis Training: A Concise Program of Emotional Education. Manchester, Vermont: Normative Publications.

 Suzuki, L. A., Ponterotto, J. G., & Meller, P. J. (2001). Handbook of multicultural assessment clinical, psychological, and educational applications (2nd ed.). San Francisco: Jossey-Bass.

External links 
 Museum of the Creative Process Research Projects

Mental disorders screening and assessment tools
Projective tests
Personality tests